Farakorosso is a town in the Mangodara Department of Comoé Province in south-western Burkina Faso, on the border with Ivory Coast. The town has a population of 3,215.

References

External links
Satellite map at Maplandia.com

Populated places in the Cascades Region
Comoé Province